Protothyrium is a genus of fungi in the family Parmulariaceae.

References

External links
Protothyrium at Index Fungorum

Parmulariaceae